Boltonia apalachicolensis, common name Apalachicola doll's-daisy, is a North American species of plants in the family Asteraceae. It is found only in the "panhandle" region of northwestern Florida in the United States.

Boltonia apalachicolensis is a plant up to 180 cm (72 inches) tall. It has many daisy-like flower heads with white or lilac ray florets and yellow disc florets.

References

Astereae
Endemic flora of Florida
Plants described in 1987